The 1978 Orkney Islands Council election, the second election to Orkney Islands Council, was held on 2 May 1978 as part of the wider 1978 Scottish regional elections.  Only independent candidates contested the election and ten seats were uncontested.

Results

Ward Results

References

Orkney
Orkney Islands Council elections